Several hundred-year flooding events occurred in 2011. In North America, the following events occurred on separate rivers and tributaries:

 2011 Assiniboine River flood
 2011 Lake Champlain and Richelieu River floods
 2011 Manitoba floods (disambiguation)
 2011 Mississippi River floods
 2011 Missouri River flood
 2011 Musselshell River flood
 2011 Red River flood
 2011 Souris River flood